The Skin I Live In is a 2011 Spanish science fiction psychological thriller film written and directed by Pedro Almodóvar, starring Antonio Banderas, Elena Anaya, Marisa Paredes, Jan Cornet and Roberto Álamo. It is based on Thierry Jonquet's 1984 novel Mygale, first published in French and then in English under the title Tarantula.

Almodóvar has described the film as "a horror story without screams or frights". The film was the first collaboration in 21 years between Almodóvar and Banderas since Tie Me Up! Tie Me Down! (1990). It premiered in May 2011 in competition at the 64th Cannes Film Festival, and won Best Film Not in the English Language at the 65th BAFTA Awards. It was also nominated for the Golden Globe Award for Best Foreign Language Film and 16 Goya Awards.

Plot
Plastic surgeon Robert Ledgard was successful in cultivating an artificial skin resistant to burns and insect bites, which he calls "GAL", that he says he has been testing on athymic mice. He presents his results in a medical symposium but when he privately discloses he has also conducted illegal transgenic experiments on humans, he is forbidden to continue with his research.

On his secluded estate, Ledgard is keeping a young woman named Vera captive, with the help of one of his servants, Marilia. Due to the suspension of his official experiments, Ledgard asks Marilia to dismiss the other servants.

While Ledgard is out, Marilia's estranged son Zeca, having committed a robbery, arrives in a tiger costume and asks his mother to hide him for a few days. He sees Vera on Ledgard's security camera screens and demands to see her in person. When Marilia refuses to let him stay after she invites him in, he binds and gags her and then rapes Vera. Ledgard arrives and kills Zeca.

While Ledgard disposes of Zeca's body, Marilia tells Vera that she (Marilia) is the mother of both Zeca and Ledgard by different men, a fact she has not shared with them. Ledgard was adopted by Marilia's employers, but was ultimately raised by her. Zeca later left to live in the streets and smuggle drugs, while Ledgard went to medical school and married a woman named Gal. When Zeca returned years later, he and Gal ran off together. They were involved in a terrible car crash in which Gal was badly burnt. Zeca had left the scene assuming her to be dead, while Ledgard had taken her from the car (in the present, Zeca had mistaken Vera for Gal, something she did not deny). Thereafter she lived in total darkness without any mirrors. One day, while hearing her daughter Norma singing in the garden, Gal accidentally sees her own reflection in the window; traumatized by the sight, she jumps to her death.

In the present, Ledgard returns and spends the night with Vera. During the night, he dreams of his past, specifically the night of a wedding six years earlier, where he finds Norma (his daughter) unconscious on the ground. Norma, who had been taking medication for psychosis—having been rendered mentally unstable due to witnessing her mother's suicide—comes to believe that Ledgard had raped her upon awakening with him above her; she subsequently develops a fear of all men and spends years in a mental health facility. She eventually kills herself in the same manner that her mother did.

Vera, too, dreams about the same event: Vicente, a young man who works in his mother's dress shop, crashes the wedding and meets Norma. Like others at the party, he is under the influence of drugs. He walks with Norma into the garden. She lists the psychiatric medications she has taken. Norma begins to take off some of her clothes, stating she would be naked all the time if she could. Vicente kisses her and compliments her. While they are lying down with Vicente on top of her, she suddenly starts to have a frantic reaction to the music playing—the same song she was singing when her mother committed suicide—and starts screaming. Vicente attempts to hush her screams, leading to her biting his hand. He slaps her, knocking her unconscious. He rearranges her clothes and flees the scene, looking around nervously for potential witnesses, just before Ledgard arrives; he is unaware that Ledgard notices him leaving on his motorbike.

Ledgard tracks down Vicente and while in disguise, knocks Vicente off his motorbike, kidnaps him, and holds him in captivity. Vicente's mother reports his disappearance to the police, but after they find his motorbike at the bottom of a cliff, they tell her he is likely dead and has been swept out to sea. Although she believes her son is still alive, her search for him remains unsolved. Meanwhile, Ledgard subjects him to a vaginoplasty and later instructs him how to slowly stretch his new vagina. Over a period of six years, Ledgard physically transforms Vicente into a replica of his late wife, and renames him Vera. During this period of time, Vicente struggles to keep himself sane and cling to the core of his true identity.

After an absence of four years, Marilia returns to work in Ledgard's house to look after Vera (Vicente).

Back in the present, Ledgard's new relationship with Vera dismays Marilia, who does not trust Vera. Fulgencio, one of Ledgard's colleagues, reads a news story about the missing Vicente and recognizes him as one of their sex change patients. He accuses Ledgard of falsifying Vicente's consent and of experimenting on him. Vera, who overhears their conversation, tells Fulgenico that she is here by his own free will, denies being Vicente, starting that she always was a woman. After Fulgenico leaves, Vera notices a photograph of himself as Vicente attached to the news story about missing persons. During the night, Ledgard and Vera start having sex, but Vera tells him that it is still painful after Zeca's rape. Ostensibly going downstairs to find lubricant, Vera retrieves Ledgard's gun and kills him. Marilia, alerted by the sound of the shot, barges into the bedroom with her own pistol in hand and finds her son Ledgard dead on the bed. Vera, who is hiding under the bed, shoots and kills Marilia. With her final breath, Marilia says "I knew it.".

Freed from captivity and the need to play along with Ledgard's whims, Vicente returns to his mother's dress shop for the first time since being kidnapped. Tearfully, he tells his lesbian ex-colleague Cristina (whom Vicente had loved six years prior) of his kidnapping, forced sex change, and the murders. As his mother enters the room, Vicente quietly reveals his identity to them in the final line of the film — "I am Vicente."

Cast

Production
Pedro Almodóvar read Thierry Jonquet's Tarantula approximately ten years before the film premiered. He described what attracted him in the novel as "the magnitude of Doctor Ledgard's vendetta". This became the core of the adaptation, which over time moved further and further from the original plot of the novel. Almodóvar was inspired by Georges Franju's Eyes Without a Face and the thriller films of Fritz Lang when he wrote the screenplay.

The director announced the project in 2002, when he envisioned Antonio Banderas and Penélope Cruz in the film's two leading roles, but eventually cast Banderas and Elena Anaya. The Skin I Live In was the first film Almodóvar and Banderas made together in 21 years, after having been regular collaborators in the 1980s. The film was produced through El Deseo for a budget of €10 million.

Principal photography began 23 August 2010 and ended almost four months later. Filming locations included Santiago de Compostela, Madrid, and a country house outside Toledo.

Release

The film premiered on 19 May 2011 in competition at the 2011 Cannes Film Festival. Due to developments in the industry of film distribution, El Deseo decided to abandon their previous release strategy for Almodóvar's works. The director's films had in the past usually been released in Spanish theatres in the spring and internationally during the last quarter of the year. The Skin I Live In was released worldwide in the autumn. The British release was 26 August 2011 through 20th Century Fox. In Spain it premiered on 2 September 2011. The film was released in the United States on 14 October the same year in a limited run through Sony Pictures Classics following its American premiere at the 49th New York Film Festival on 12 October 2011.

Critical reception
On the review aggregator website Rotten Tomatoes, the film holds an 81% approval rating based on reviews from 177 critics, with an average rating of 7.5 out of 10. The site's summary reads "The Skin I Live In lacks Almodovar's famously charged romance, replaced with a wonderfully bizarre and unpredictable detour into arthouse ick". In May 2011, Kirk Honeycutt, writing for The Hollywood Reporter, said "Along with such usual Almodóvar obsessions as betrayal, anxiety, loneliness, sexual identity, and death, the Spanish director has added a science-fiction element that verges on horror. But like many lab experiments, this melodramatic hybrid makes for an unstable fusion. Only someone as talented as Almodóvar could have mixed such elements without blowing up an entire movie." Honeycutt continued: "The film's design, costumes and music, especially Alberto Iglesias' music, present a lushly beautiful setting, which is nonetheless a prison and house of horror. Almodóvar pumps his movie full of deadly earnestness and heady emotions." David Gritten notes Almodóvar "reaches out tentatively into unexplored genre territory—horror...Yet despite squirm-worthy moments ... the promise of horror gives way to Almodóvar's broader, familiar preoccupations: identity, blood ties, disguises and genetic traits." According to Gritten, "A list of the story's various elements— date rape, murder, secrets, lies, mystery parents, gender ambiguity, unbreakable emotional bonds—confirms The Skin I Live In as essentially a melodrama. Yet Almodóvar's story-telling is nowhere near as shrill as it once was: as a mature artist, he has refined his skills to a point where these soap-opera tropes assimilate smoothly into a complex whole....Typically for Almodóvar, it all looks ravishing, thanks to production designer Antxon Gómez and cinematographer José Luis Alcaine. All three men have the gift of investing mundane objects with a unique sheen; here even surgical instruments, about to be used malevolently, assume a dreamy, otherworldly quality. The Skin I Live In is the work of a master near the top of his game."

Upon its UK premiere, Peter Bradshaw gave it four of five stars, calling it "fantastically twisted" and "a truly macabre suspense thriller"—"Banderas is a wonderfully charismatic leading man; Almodóvar has found in him what Hitchcock found in Cary Grant. He is stylish, debonair, but with a chilling touch of determination and menace."

In an October 2011 New York Times Critics' Pick review, Manohla Dargis called the film "an existential mystery, a melodramatic thriller, a medical horror film or just a polymorphous extravaganza"; according to Dargis: 
It takes time to get a handle on the story (and even then, your grip may not be secure), though it's instantly clear that something is jumping beneath the surface here, threatening to burst forth. Vera's plight and the temporal shifts help create an air of unease and barely controlled chaos, an unsettling vibe that becomes spooky when Ledgard puts on a white lab coat and begins doing strange things with blood....There are times in The Skin I Live In when it feels as if the whole thing will fly into pieces, as complication is piled onto complication, and new characters and intrigues are introduced amid horror, melodrama and slapstick.... [Yet] Mr. Almodóvar's control remains virtuosic and the film hangs together completely, secured by Vera and Ledgard and a relationship that's a Pandora's box from which identity, gender, sex and desire spring.

Dana Stevens noted it was Almodóvar's "first attempt to blend elements of the horror genre with the high-camp, gender-bending melodrama that's become his stock in trade"; she called it "visually lush and thematically ambitious", a film that "unfolds with a clinical chill we're unaccustomed to feeling in this director's films. The Skin I Live In is a math problem, not a poem. Still, what an elegant proof it is." Stevens called it a "meditation on profound themes: memory, grief, violence, degradation, and survival", a "multigenerational melodrama [that] slowly fuse[s] into a coherent (if wackily improbable) whole", offering  "aesthetic and intellectual gratification, but little in the way of emotional punch." The New Yorker ranked the film at No. 25 on their list of "The 26 best films of 2011".

Accolades
Anaya received the Goya Award for Best Actress. The film won Best Film Not in the English Language at the 65th British Academy Film Awards; in previous years Almodóvar won that same award for his 1999 film All About My Mother and his 2002 film Talk to Her.

See also 
 List of Spanish films of 2011

References

Bibliography

External links
  (Spain)
  (US)
 
 
 
 
 

2011 films
2011 horror thriller films
2011 LGBT-related films
2011 psychological thriller films
2011 science fiction films
2011 thriller drama films
2010s horror drama films
2010s psychological drama films
2010s psychological horror films
2010s science fiction drama films
2010s science fiction horror films
2010s science fiction thriller films
2010s Spanish films
2010s Spanish-language films
BAFTA winners (films)
Best Foreign Language Film BAFTA Award winners
Body horror films
Body swapping in films
Burn survivors in fiction
El Deseo films
Films about surgeons
Films based on French novels
Films directed by Pedro Almodóvar
Films produced by Agustín Almodóvar
Films scored by Alberto Iglesias
Films set in Spain
Films shot in Madrid
Films shot in the province of Toledo
Lesbian-related films
LGBT-related controversies in film
LGBT-related horror thriller films
LGBT-related science fiction drama films
LGBT-related science fiction horror films
LGBT-related thriller drama films
Mad scientist films
Magic realism films
Spanish films about revenge
Spanish horror drama films
Spanish horror thriller films
Spanish LGBT-related films
Spanish psychological thriller films
Spanish science fiction drama films
Spanish science fiction horror films
Spanish science fiction thriller films
Spanish thriller drama films
Works about plastic surgery